The Military ranks of Comoros are the military insignia used by the Comorian Armed Forces.  Comoros has neither a navy nor an air force, with France providing protection of territorial waters and air surveillance.

Commissioned officer ranks
The rank insignia of commissioned officers.

Other ranks
The rank insignia of non-commissioned officers and enlisted personnel.

References

External links
 

Comoros
Ranks